Raja Choudhury (born Ranjit Choudhury, 11 June 1964) is a National Film Award (India) winning documentary film maker, architect, public speaker, spiritual teacher on The Shift Network, and designer of multimedia installations and events and Web sites, some of which have received Webby Awards. He produces international documentary films on Indian wisdom, history and consciousness. Films he has made include Spirituality in the Modern World, I Believe:Universal Values for a Global Society, The Modern Mystic, The Quantum Indians, Yoga: Aligning to the Source and most recently India's official global film celebrating the International Day of Yoga entitled Yoga Harmony with Nature which was released on 21 June 2015. He is currently producing a new film with WTTW Chicago PBS called America's First Guru on Swami Vivekananda and the arrival of Yoga and Hinduism into the popular American conversation in 1893. Raja is on the faculty of The Shift Network online teaching subjects on Indian Wisdom. Raja is also a teacher at A Thousand Suns Academy teaching advanced programs and workshops in Indian wisdom and meditation.

Early life
Raja Choudhury was born in Ibadan, Nigeria to Indian parents Sukumar and Manjusri Choudhury on 11 June 1964. His father was a UN expert on deputation to the WHO from India. He grew up in Nigeria and then Freetown, Sierra Leone where he attended the Sierra Leone Grammar School. At 16 he moved to Canada and studied at the University of Waterloo. He went on to study Architecture at the AA School of Architecture in 1984 in London, UK where he graduated in 1992. At the AA he started the Computer Graphics Unit before graduating bringing CAD and 3D modelling to the school for the first time. At the AA he studied with architects Ron Herron and Ranulph Glanville and cybernetics expert Gordon Pask.

Early Career in Digital Media

In 1993 Choudhury, Mudimo Okondo, and Emma Westecott founded Zone UK, a digital design company in London. Choudhury designed the VID Zone Kiosk Network at Tower Records and HMV stores in London. The kiosk was described as "The Best Public Demo of Multimedia Ever" by Design Technology Magazine. In 1995 the team at Zone launched the UK's first CDROM Music & Lifestyle Magazine UnZip with IPC Magazines which was awarded a Milia D’Or at Mipcom in Cannes in 1996. Zone was the first company in the UK to introduce kiosk and the Internet into music stores, night clubs and university bars. In 1997 Zone installed multimedia kiosks in 10 London universities, providing the MeTV Network for students. Choudhury moved to New York City in 1998 and designed the FastTake Video Kiosk Network, the online launches of Softbank, NetValue and BT Conferencing, and became creative director for agencies Cohn & Wolfe and Converseon. In 2007 he designed Websites Webby Honorees in 2008: OurWeddingDay.com and CBCWorldwide.com. In 2008 he produced India's first multimedia broadband kiosk entertainment network for Coca-Cola called the Dilli Dil Se Network in time for the 2009 Indian Premier League offering videos, video chat, facts, results, games, social networking and mobile downloads. The touch-screen kiosks were available at 30 locations across New Delhi. Since 2009, Raja has continued to work in the digital space advising large brands and non-profit organizations including tGELF, Alchemist Group and The Shift Network.

Documentary films
Choudhury's first documentary film as a co-producer and art director was "Desi: South Asians of New York" for PBS Channel Thirteen in 2000 with Glazer Creative in New York. He then started publishing a newsletter entitled Universal Quest with A.T. Mann. He went on to produce numerous videos for the American India Foundation, the Ramakrishna-Vivekananda Center and others. In 2006 he produced his first documentary film "Spirituality in the Modern World" which captured a dialogue between Ken Wilber and Traleg Kyabgon Rinpoche. The DVD was released in 2007.

In 2010 Raja produced his second documentary film "I Believe: Universal Values for a Global Society" on the beliefs of Karan Singh. The film was launched by India's Prime Minister Manmohan Singh in March 2011, and was shown on India's national public TV network Doordarshan. In 2011 he produced the film "The Modern Mystic" on the spiritual teacher Sri M of Madanapalle. The DVD was launched in Bangalore India in October 2011. Both films were selected for the Spirit Enlightened Film Festival at CultureUnplugged.com. In 2012 he produced "The 21st Century Indian" profiling S. M. Krishna, India's Minister of External Affairs. In August 2013 Choudhury launched the film The Quantum Indians about the great Indian scientists Satyendranath Bose, CV Raman and Meghnad Saha for the Public Service Broadcasting Trust of India (PSBT) and the Public Diplomacy Division of the Ministry of External Affairs of India. This film won the National Film Award for Best Educational/Motivational/Instructional Film of 2013 and also the prestigious Golden Beaver Award given by the Indian Department of Science and Technology, Vigyan Prasar, as the Best Public Science Film of 2013. He also produced 2 acclaimed films on Yoga Yoga: Aligning to the Source on the origins, mythology, practice, and history of Yoga was launched on 26 November 2013 and includes appearances by BKS Iyengar, Karan Singh and Devdutt Pattanaik and India's official film celebrating the International Day of Yoga entitled Yoga Harmony with Nature which was released on 21 June 2015.

In 2023, Raja is completing production of a film for PBS called America's First Guru which tells the story of Swami Vivekananda and how his arrival in Chicago in 1893 led to a spiritual revolution in American culture, words, and consciousness. The film is being distributed in the fall of 2023 by WTTW Chicago.

Public Speaking, Awards & Acclaim
Raja has received numerous awards and media coverage for his work in films and digital media including The 2014 National Film Award for Best Educational/Motivational/Instructional Film(India) for 2013, The 2014 Golden Beaver Award for Best Indian Public Science Film from Vigyan Prashar, 2 Webby Awards in 2008, an Adobe Site of the Day and the Milia D’Or at MipCom. In May 2012, Raja presented a talk at the TED conference TED@Bangalore on "Indian Wisdom in Today's World". Raja gave a TEDx Talk on "Yoga 3.0" in New Delhi on 21 June 2015 to celebrate the first International Day of Yoga. He also gave the keynote address at the 2015 Porter Prize in New Delhi on "Rewiring the Brain." From 2016 onwards, Raja has given a series of public lectures called Universal Quest with Dr. Karan Singh at the India International Center in New Delhi, India on Kundalini, Soma, Shiva, The Art and Science of Meditation, Hacking Your Consciousness.

Spiritual Teacher
In 2015, Raja started leading talks and workshops in New Delhi under the Universal Quest banner and they were made available on Youtube attracting thousands of views. As a result in 2018, he was asked to develop a course on the ancient Indian system of Kundalini for the popular US online platform The Shift Network. His first course Awakening Your Kundalini premiered in March 2018 and since then Raja has taught 11 courses with over 4,000 students and is considered a popular teacher on the network. In 2019, Raja started teaching an Advanced Program on Indian Wisdom on a new online school A Thousand Suns Academy that represents him in the US.

Personal life
Raja married designer Jagriti Chadha in 2005, and they have a daughter and live in the United States.

Filmography

Major Web and Multimedia Projects

References

External links
 
Raja Choudhury's Official Website

1964 births
Living people
Filmmakers from Ibadan
Film directors from Delhi
Indian filmmakers
Indian documentary filmmakers
Indian documentary film directors
Indian expatriates in Nigeria
Indian expatriates in the United Kingdom
Indian expatriates in the United States
University of Waterloo alumni
Alumni of the Architectural Association School of Architecture